Markos Zavitsianos (Greek:Μάρκος Ζαβιτσίανος; 1884, Istanbul — 1923, Geneva) was a Greek printmaker, painter, and early socialist.

Biography 
He was born to an aristocratic Greek family from Corfu. His father was a doctor. His mother, of French origin, was an amateur artist. For a time, he studied at the Phanar Greek Orthodox College but, in 1902, his family returned to Corfu.

In 1904, he went to Munich, where he studied at the Academy of Fine Arts with the history painter, Gabriel von Hackl. He also took lessons in engraving. During his stay there, he became close friends with the writer, one of the first Greek socialists, and was strongly influenced by his ideas. At the age of only twenty-three, he became deeply involved in the controversy surrounding the Marxist inspired book, Our Common Goal (Το Κοινωνικόν μας Ζήτημα), by Georgios Skliros; writing several pieces for the literary magazine, .  

He returned to Corfu in 1911, where he collaborated with the writer,  in creating the "Socialist Club of Corfu". The following year, he exhibited his works at the Zappeion, and began participating in an artists' society known as the "Fellowship of the Nine". For the remainder of his life, he was a prolific exhibitor; throughout Greece as well as in Paris and Berlin. 

In 1912, he provided illustrations for Η τιμή και το χρήμα (Price and Money), a novel by Theotokis that the Socialist Club had published. In 1915, he was one of the founders of the literary journal, Ανθολογία Κέρκυρας  (Corfu Anthology), which served as a venue for his engravings. From 1919 to 1922, he worked on a series of illustrations for a new edition of Στον ήσκιο της συκιάς (In the Shade of the Fig Tree), a collection of short stories by the Demoticist writer, . It was never published.

While visiting Geneva in 1923, he contracted a case of pneumonia and died, aged only thirty-nine.

 References 

 Biography and works @ the National Gallery of Athens

Further reading
 Μάρκος Ζαβιτσιάνος: Έργα και Κείμενα (Markos Zavitsianos: Works and Texts), introduction by Dionysis Kapsalis, Cultural Foundation of the National Bank of Greece, 2013 

External links

 Works and a brief biography by Irene Zavitsianou @ the Corfu Gallery
 "The Engravings of Markos Zavitsianos" @ '' (The Dawn)

1884 births
1923 deaths
Greek painters
Greek engravers
Greek illustrators
Academy of Fine Arts, Munich alumni
Deaths from pneumonia in Switzerland
Artists from Istanbul
Greek socialists